

Willibald Borowietz (17 September 1893  – 1 July 1945) was a German general during World War II who commanded several divisions.  He was a recipient of the  Knight's Cross of the Iron Cross with Oak Leaves of Nazi Germany.

Borowietz surrendered to Allied forces together with the Afrika Korps. He was held as a POW by the United States in Camp Clinton, Mississippi, where he committed suicide by electrocuting himself in a bathtub on 1 July 1945. Officially his death was attributed to a cerebral hemorrhage.

His wife, Eva Ledien, was of Jewish descent. She committed suicide in October 1938 so that their children could be Aryanized. Eva's sister, Käthe (Ledien) Bosse, was killed in Ravensbrück concentration camp on 16 December 1944.

Awards and decorations
 Iron Cross (1914) 2nd Class (6 October 1914) & 1st Class (25 June 1915)
 Clasp to the Iron Cross (1939) 2nd Class (25 September 1939) & 1st Class  (11 June 1940)
 German Cross in Gold on 14 June 1942 as Oberst in Schützen-Regiment 10
 Knight's Cross of the Iron Cross with Oak Leaves
 Knight's Cross on 24 July 1941 as Oberstleutnant and commander of Schützen-Regiment 10
 Oak Leaves on 10 May 1943 as Generalmajor and commander of 15.Panzer-Division

References

Citations

Bibliography

 
 
 

1893 births
1945 suicides
People from Racibórz
People from the Province of Silesia
Lieutenant generals of the German Army (Wehrmacht)
German Army personnel of World War I
Prussian Army personnel
Recipients of the clasp to the Iron Cross, 1st class
Recipients of the Gold German Cross
Recipients of the Knight's Cross of the Iron Cross with Oak Leaves
Recipients of the Silver Medal of Military Valor
German prisoners of war in World War II held by the United States
German people who died in prison custody
Prisoners who died in United States military detention
German police officers
20th-century Freikorps personnel
Nazis who committed suicide in prison custody
Suicides by electrocution
Suicides in Mississippi
German Army generals of World War II